Tŝideldel, also called Redstone, is an unincorporated settlement and First Nations community of the Tsilhqot'in people, located near Chilanko Forks in the Chilcotin District of the Central Interior of British Columbia, Canada.  Located on the Chilanko River, it should not be confused with the locality also called Redstone, 16 km to the east, located at the confluence of the Chilanko and Chilcotin Rivers,. It includes Redstone Flat Indian Reserve No. 1, Redstone Flat Indian Reserve No. 1A, and Redstone Cemetery Indian Reserve No. 1B, all under the administration of the Alexis Creek First Nation.

References

Unincorporated settlements in British Columbia
Tsilhqot'in communities
Populated places in the Chilcotin